Porterville (also Maryville) is a census-designated place and unincorporated community in Kemper County, Mississippi. It lies a slight distance away from U.S. Route 45 southeast of the city of De Kalb, the county seat of Kemper County.  Its elevation is 200 feet (61 m).  It has a post office with the ZIP code 39352. It is adjacent to Lake Porterville.

Demographics

History
Porterville was named for the first postmaster, Willie N. Porter. The community is located on the Kansas City Southern Railway and the post office first opened on May 24, 1890. Porterville was once home to several stores and in 1906 had a population of 200.

The Porterville General Store is listed on the National Register of Historical Places.

Notable people
 Clay Hopper, former professional baseball player and member of the International League Hall of Fame
 Devonta Pollard, professional basketball player

References

Unincorporated communities in Kemper County, Mississippi
Unincorporated communities in Mississippi
Census-designated places in Kemper County, Mississippi